William Slack is the name of:

 William Slack (surgeon) (1925–2019), Serjeant Surgeon to Queen Elizabeth II
 William Y. Slack (1816–1862), lawyer, politician, and general in the Missouri State Guard